John Abthorpe (19 January 1933 – 7 July 2005), born and died in Nottingham, was an English professional footballer who played in the Football League as a forward.

References

1933 births
2005 deaths
Footballers from Nottingham
English footballers
Association football forwards
Wolverhampton Wanderers F.C. players
Notts County F.C. players
English Football League players